The Girl Guides Association of the United Arab Emirates is the national Guiding organization of the United Arab Emirates. The association serves 2,484 members (as of 2017). Founded in 1973, the girls-only organization became a full member of the World Association of Girl Guides and Girl Scouts in 1984.

The Girl Guide emblem incorporates elements of the emblem as well as the flag of the United Arab Emirates.

See also
 Emirates Scout Association

References

World Association of Girl Guides and Girl Scouts member organizations
Scouting and Guiding in the United Arab Emirates
Youth organizations established in 1973